This is a list of members of the Tasmanian House of Assembly between the 23 January 1913 election and the 25 March 1916 election. On 6 April 1914, John Earle, leader of the Labor Party, formed a government and led for the rest of the term.

Notes
  Liberal MHA for Wilmot, Jonathan Best, died on 13 May 1913. Liberal candidate Ernest Blyth was elected on 24 June 1913.
  Labor MHA for Darwin, James Ogden, resigned in July 1913 and was re-elected on 5 August 1913.
  Liberal MHA for Denison, John Davies, died on 12 November 1913. Labor candidate and former MHA William Sheridan was elected on 10 January 1914, resulting in the Liberals losing their majority in the House.
  Liberal MHA for Wilmot, Edward Mulcahy, resigned in October 1914 and was re-elected on 7 November 1914.
  Liberal MHA for Bass, Albert Solomon, died on 5 October 1914. Liberal candidate Alexander Marshall was elected on 21 November 1914.
  Labor MHA for Bass, Arthur Anderson, died on 5 May 1915. Labor candidate James McDonald was elected on 26 June 1915.
  Liberal MHA for Franklin, Norman Ewing, resigned on 22 September 1915. Liberal candidate Daniel Ryan was elected on 11 October 1915.

Sources
 
 Parliament of Tasmania (2006). The Parliament of Tasmania from 1856

Members of Tasmanian parliaments by term
20th-century Australian politicians